Enigma is the fourth studio album by American heavy metal band Ill Niño, released in the United States on March 11, 2008 through Cement Shoes Records. The album's first single "The Alibi of Tyrants" was released to radio on April 22, 2007. The band has stated they would film three music videos from the album, including "The Alibi of Tyrants", "Me Gusta La Soledad" and "Pieces of the Sun". The album was originally set for a July 17, 2007 release, but was delayed on several occasions. The album is available on most digital distribution platforms, including iTunes.

The album debuted and peaked on the Billboard charts at No. 145, with first week's sales of 6,000 copies. By June 2010, the album had allegedly sold 80,000 copies worldwide. With a total length of over 50 minutes, it's the band's longest studio album to date, not counting special editions with bonus tracks.

Track listing

Limited edition
The European version of the album was released in a limited edition digipak, including all five tracks from the band's 2006 EP The Under Cover Sessions.

Singles
 "The Alibi of Tyrants" – The video was filmed live at the 2007 With Full Force festival in Germany.

Credits
Cristian Machado - vocals
Ahrue Luster - guitar
Diego Verduzco - guitar
Lazaro Pina - bass
Danny Couto - percussion
Dave Chavarri - drums

References

2008 albums
Albums produced by Eddie Wohl
Ill Niño albums